Huch'uy Pirwalla (Quechua huch'uy small, Hispanicized spelling Uchuy Pirhualla) is a mountain in the Andes of Peru, about  high. It is situated in the Ayacucho Region, Víctor Fajardo Province, Sarhua District, northeast of Hatun Pirwalla (Quechua hatun big, Hispanicized Catún Pirualla).

Southwest of Huch'uy Pirwalla, beyond the Llallawi valley, there is another mountain of the same name.

References

Mountains of Peru
Mountains of Ayacucho Region